Deniss Kačanovs (born 27 November 1979) is a Latvian football defender, currently playing for Adlwang in the second lowest Austrian football league.

Club career
Kačanovs started his career in FC Universitate Riga, later on joining FK Ventspils in 2000. In 2001, he joined FK Daugava Rīga, but in 2002 rejoined FK Ventspils once again. He played there for 7 years, making 151 appearances and scoring 6 league goals. He was released in 2009 because of being in suspect of betting on his own team's results, and was without a club for more than a year. His fault wasn't proved then, and the player stated he had had several conflicts with FK Ventspils for a long time. In February 2011 he joined Skonto Riga. In a league match against his former team FK Ventspils Kačanovs seriously injured their defender Vladimirs Bespalovs with a rude tackle from behind, whose further career then seemed to be in doubt for a moment. In fact, Bespalovs is a son of FK Ventspils president Jurijs Bespalovs. He thought that Kačanovs had done this on purpose and handed in a request for Latvian Football Federation to ban the player. Kačanovs was given a long-term disqualification then. In September 2011, after having played 16 matches and scored 1 goal for Skonto, he left for Indonesian team Persema Malang. In July 2012, Kačanovs returned to the Latvian Higher League, signing with FC Jūrmala. He played 13 matches for Jūrmala, finishing the league in the sixth position. In January 2013 Kačanovs joined the Latvian Higher League club Daugava Rīga.

International career
Kačanovs made his debut for Latvia in 2006. So far he has collected 29 appearances, scoring no goals. He played his last international match in 2011.

Honours
FK Ventspils
 Latvian Higher League
 2006, 2007, 2008
 Latvian Football Cup
 2004, 2005, 2007

National Team
 Baltic Cup
 2008

References

External links

1979 births
Living people
Footballers from Riga
Latvian footballers
Latvian people of Russian descent
Latvia international footballers
Latvian expatriate footballers
Expatriate footballers in Indonesia
Latvian expatriate sportspeople in Indonesia
Indonesian Premier League players
FK Ventspils players
Skonto FC players
Persema Malang players
FC Jūrmala players
FK Daugava (2003) players
Association football defenders